The Addams Family: An Evilution is a book about the "evilution" of The Addams Family characters created by American cartoonist Charles Addams. The book was made to celebrate The Addams Family musical that opened on Broadway in April 2010.

An Evilution is the first book to trace The Addams Family history. It presents more than 200 cartoons created by Addams during his career, including some that were never published. It is arranged by H. Kevin Miserocchi, director of the Tee and Charles Addams Foundation. Each chapter of the book shows a chronology of each character’s evolution throughout the television shows, movies, and other depictions of the family. The chapters are also headed by Addams's own character descriptions that were originally used for the TV show producers.

Opening note

Chapter list 
 Preface/Introduction
 The Family
 Morticia
 Gomez
 Wednesday and the boy, Pugsley
 Lurch, the butler
 Granny Frump (a.k.a. Grandma Frump)
 Uncle Fester
 Thing
 Relatives & Family Friends
 A House to "die for"

References

External links 
 Excerpt from An Evilution

2010 non-fiction books
The Addams Family